Faifili Levave (born ) is a Samoan rugby union player currently playing for the Mitsubishi Sagamihara DynaBoars in the Top League. He previously notably played for the Wellington Lions and the Hurricanes in Super Rugby. His position of choice is flanker.

Levave was born in Wellington. He attended St Patrick's College.

Levave made his provincial rugby debut at the age of 19 for Wellington. The next year, aged twenty, he made the Hurricanes wider training group. However, a pectoral strain kept him on the sidelines for most of the year. In 2007, Levave played 14 games for the Lions, including five starts at blindside flanker. Earlier in the season he played for the New Zealand U21 team.

Levave signed a two-year deal with Japanese club Toyota Verblitz in 2014, he previously played for another Japanese club in 2012 the Honda Heat.

References

External links
Hurricanes Profile
Wellington Profile
itsrugby.co.uk Profile

Living people
Rugby union flankers
1986 births
People educated at St. Patrick's College, Wellington
New Zealand rugby union players
New Zealand sportspeople of Samoan descent
Chiefs (rugby union) players
Hurricanes (rugby union) players
Wellington rugby union players
Waikato rugby union players
Rugby union players from Wellington City
Samoa international rugby union players
Toyota Verblitz players
Mitsubishi Sagamihara DynaBoars players
Expatriate rugby union players in Japan